Sophie of Saxe-Lauenburg (1428 – 9 September 1473) was a German regent, Duchess of Jülich-Berg by marriage to Gerhard VIII of Jülich-Berg. She was regent of Jülich, Berg and Ravensberg during the incapacity of her spouse and the minority of her eldest son William IV from 1456 until 1473.

Life 
Sophie was the daughter of Duke Bernard II of Saxe-Lauenburg († 1463) from his marriage to Adelheid (who died after 1445), a daughter the Duke Bogislaw VIII of Pomerania.

In 1444, she married Duke Gerhard VIII of Jülich-Berg, Count of Ravensberg (born: 1416 or 1417; died: 1475).

Regency
In approximately 1456, Gerhard lapsed into insanity and was incapable of ruling. Sophie took over the reins of government in the Duchy as regent, since her firstborn son, who would otherwise have been considered for the regency, was himself a minor.

In 1470, she was libelled by Frederick of Sombreff.  Her sons responded by besieging his Tomburg Castle and setting it on fire.  Sophie later rebuilt the castle.

Issue 
Sophie from her marriage had the following children:
 William IV (1455–1511), Duke of Jülich-Berg
 Anna, married Count Johann of Moers and Saarwerden (died in 1507)
 Adolph (1458–1470)
 Gerhard (died young)

References 
 Gisela Meyer: Die Familie von Palant im Mittelalter, Vandenhoeck & Ruprecht, 2004, p. 370
 Historischer Verein für den Niederrhein, insbesondere die Alte Erzdiözese Köln: Annalen des Historischen Vereins für den Niederrhein, insbesondere die Alte Erzdiözese Köln, J. P. Bachem, Cologne, 1856, p. 65 (online)

External links 

Regents of Germany
House of Ascania
German duchesses
15th-century births
Year of birth uncertain
1473 deaths
15th-century German people
15th-century German women
15th-century women rulers
Daughters of monarchs